The Angus Armanasco Stakes is a Melbourne Racing Club Group 2 Thoroughbred horse race for three-year-old fillies, held under Set Weights conditions with penalties,  over a distance of 1400 metres at Caulfield Racecourse in Melbourne, Australia in late February. Total prizemoney is A$300,000.

History
The race is named in honour of the late Australian Racing Hall of Fame horse trainer, Angus Armanasco.

Name 
 1976–1990 - Tranquil Star Stakes
 1991–1993 - The Dalgety Stakes
 1994 - The Inglis Premier Sale Stakes
 1995 - The Jewel Stakes
 1996 onwards - Angas Armanasco Stakes

Distance
 1976–1981 – 1400 metres
 1982–1985 – 1600 metres
 1986–1996 – 1400 metres
 1997–2009 – 1600 metres
 2010 onwards - 1400 metres

Grade 
 1976–1979 - Principal Race
 1980–1999 - Group 3
 2000 onwards - Group 2

Venue
In 1996 and 2023 the event was held at Sandown Racecourse.

Winners

 2023 - Shuffle Dancer
 2022 - Lavish Girl 
 2021 - Yes Baby Yes  
 2020 - La Tene  
 2019 - Qafila 
 2018 - Summer Sham 
 2017 - Savanna Amour 
 2016 - Catch A Fire 
 2015 - Sabatini 
 2014 - Spirits Dance
 2013 - Meliora
 2012 - Shopaholic
 2011 - Pinker Pinker
 2010 - Set For Fame
 2009 - Gold Water
 2008 - Zarita
 2007 - Miss Finland
 2006 - Serenade Rose
 2005 - Ballet Society
 2004 - Special Harmony
 2003 - La Bella Dame
 2002 - Elegant Fashion
 2001 - Rose Archway
 2000 - I Am A Ripper
 1999 - Rose O' War
 1998 - Champagne
 1997 - Cheval Place
 1996 - Not On Friday
 1995 - Northwood Plume
 1994 - †Party Time / Sovereign Appeal
 1993 - Big Jamaica
 1992 - Rockabye
 1991 - Tessuti
 1990 - Deira
 1989 - Seapost
 1988 - Golden Unicorn
 1987 - Shackle
 1986 - Golden Twig
 1985 - Delightful Belle
 1984 - Richebourg
 1983 - Irish Heiress
 1982 - Rogue's Delight
 1981 - Tynia
 1980 - Bravita
 1979 - Sonstone
 1978 - Pushy
 1977 - Brett’s Honour
 1976 - Better Draw

†Dead heat

See also
 List of Australian Group races
 Group races

References

Horse races in Australia
Flat horse races for three-year-old fillies
Caulfield Racecourse